Stephen Rebello is an  American writer, screenwriter, journalist and former clinical therapist.

Early life
Born to parents of third-generation Portuguese American and French-Portuguese American extraction in Fall River, Massachusetts, Rebello was raised in Somerset, Massachusetts. He graduated from Somerset High School where he co-edited the school newspaper, sang in male chorus, and was a soloist in the mixed chorus. As a child singer, he performed on a weekly radio show and did extensive live performances.

He graduated with a B.A. from the University of Massachusetts Dartmouth, where he double majored in literature and psychology. He received a master's degree from Simmons College School of Social Work in Boston, specialized in private therapy and counseling in a Boston, Massachusetts hospital affiliated with Harvard University, and began doctoral work at Harvard University.

Writing career
After several years as a clinical social worker and supervisor at a Harvard University-affiliated hospital and also as a private therapist in Boston, he relocated in 1980 to Los Angeles. Continuing his work as a therapist there for several years, he eventually branched into journalism, publishing feature articles and interviews in The Real Paper, Cinefantastique, American Film Magazine, the Los Angeles Times, Saturday Review,  Cosmopolitan, Movieline, GQ and More, among others.

His interview subjects have included David Fincher, James Cameron, Alfred Hitchcock, Chuck Yeager, Steven Soderbergh, Matt Damon, Jerry Bruckheimer, Tom Cruise, Robert Downey, Jr., Sigourney Weaver, Nicole Kidman, Scarlett Johansson, Sandra Bullock, Joaquin Phoenix, Michelle Pfeiffer, Heath Ledger, Kate Winslet, Drew Barrymore, Keanu Reeves, Matthew McConaughey, and Denzel Washington. For nearly two decades, he was aPlayboy magazine contributor, writing dozens of the magazine's famous interviews and features, winning several awards in process. He also wrote their magazine and online film criticism and served as a Contributing Editor.

Reel Art (1988)
On May 30, 1988, Abbeville Press published his award-winning non-fiction book Reel Art: Great Posters From the Golden Age of the Silver Screen (with Richard C. Allen). The book generated film poster exhibitions in 1988 at the Museum of the Moving Image in Astoria, Queens, New York and in 1990 in the Paine Webber Building in New York City. The book was honored at an event at the Academy of Motion Picture Arts and Sciences as one of the best ever written about Hollywood.

Alfred Hitchcock and the Making of Psycho (1990)

Rebello's 1990 non-fiction book Alfred Hitchcock and the Making of Psycho, distributed by W. W. Norton, received considerable praise on publication. Christopher Lehmann-Haupt in the May 7, 1990 edition of The New York Times declared it a "meticulous history of a single film production."  Critic, author and filmmaker Richard Schickel called the book "indispensable and marvelously readable" and "one of the best accounts of the making of an individual movie we've ever had." Reviewer Gary Johnson called the book "one of the best books ever written about the making of a movie" and "unquestionably the best source available." Critic Leonard Maltin on his blog called the book a "landmark."

Paperback editions have been published by St. Martin's Griffin and by W. W. Norton.  Hardcover editions have been published in the U.K., Germany, Australia, Italy, Portugal, China, Russia, Korea, and Japan.  The book has become a standard and continues to be used in film studies classes on director Alfred Hitchcock.  The book was optioned by a major network for production as a TV film and, subsequently, by three film companies for a feature.  The 2012 film Hitchcock starring Anthony Hopkins, Helen Mirren, and Scarlett Johansson was adapted from the book.

Work at Disney (1990s)
During the latter half of the 1990s, Rebello worked alongside many Disney artists as a writer on several ambitious animated film concepts and projects that remain unproduced. He also wrote three books for Disney Hyperion. They are The Art of Pocahontas, The Art of the Hunchback of Notre Dame and Hercules: The Chaos of Creation. In addition, Rebello wrote an as yet unproduced teleplay for a live-action version of a Disney animation classic with music for the American Broadcasting Company (ABC).

Hitchcock (2012)

In 2005, several entertainment magazines announced the optioning of the screen rights to Alfred Hitchcock and the Making of Psycho for a television movie or miniseries. That option was superseded when two other major production companies optioned the rights for a theatrical motion picture version. In January 2010, Paramount Pictures purchased the screen rights to the book. Among the many directors who expressed interest were Spike Lee, Mark Romanek, Julian Fellowes, Lee Daniels, Steven Spielberg, Richard Kwietniowski, and Louis Letterier. The film began development in 2011 by The Montecito Picture Company with director Sacha Gervasi at the helm of the feature, subsequently entitled Hitchcock. Early screenplay drafts were written by Black Swan co-writer John J. McLaughlin; Rebello wrote several subsequent revised drafts. By late 2011, Fox Searchlight Pictures bought the project and the film was cast with Anthony Hopkins,  Helen Mirren, Scarlett Johansson, James D'Arcy, Jessica Biel, Toni Collette, Danny Huston, Michael Stuhlbarg, Ralph Macchio, Michael Wincott, Richard Portnow and Kurtwood Smith.   Principal photography began on location on April 13, 2012 and the film was released in selected U.S. cities on November 23, 2012, with a nationwide and worldwide theatrical expansion thereafter. It underperformed at the box office with a modest take of $27,039,669.Hitchcock was chosen as the opening night film of the 2012 American Film Institute's annual film festival, with the Steven Spielberg-directed Lincoln as the closing night attraction.

Dolls! Dolls! Dolls! (2020)
Penguin Books published Rebello's non-fiction book, Dolls! Dolls! Dolls!, on June 2 and a second printing was ordered less than a month later. The book, which details the history of Jacqueline Susann writing her bestselling novel and Hollywood's movie adaptation of that novel, received considerable media attention and critical praise. The editors of Vogue chose it as one of best books of the summer, praising its "great detail and heavy research" and calling it "as heady and colorful as the pulsating Pucci prints Susann so famously wore." Kirkus Reviews thought the book was "written with a cinematic excitement," "meticulously detailed," and "a blissful treasure trove of gossipy insider details that Dolls fans will swiftly devour." Publishers Weekly called it "exuberant" and "loving." Library Journal wrote "Rebello packs tons of information into this loving look at a cultural and cult phenomenon ... Go ahead: indulge yourself. Fans will love! love! love! and newcomers will enjoy the Hollywood insider aspect."  The Washington Post called it "full of surprises and even suspense" and The Hollywood Reporter placed it on its list of 20 books of the summer. The Canberra Times book critic called it, "Hilarious and informative...Stephen Rebello has written two of my favorite books about movies. And now he's written a third ... a must-read for fans of Susann, fans of movies and fans of pop culture." Theater Jones called it "fascinating," "enlightening" and "entertaining," and "required reading for all Valley of the Dolls fans, of course, but also highly recommended as a postmortem view of the birth of a blockbuster, circa the 1960s." During its first month of publication alone, the book was listed on Amazon as #1 Best Seller in such categories as: Entertainment Industry; Movie History & Criticism; Literary Criticism & Theory; and on  Amazon Kindle in various categories including #1 New Release in "Sports & Entertainment."

Bibliography
Reel Art - Great Posters From the Golden Age of the Silver Screen (with Richard C. Allen) (1988), Abbeville Press.
Alfred Hitchcock and the Making of Psycho (1990), Dembner Books
Bad Movies We Love (with Edward Margulies) (1993), Plume
The Art of Pocahontas (1995), Hyperion
The Art of the Hunchback of Notre Dame (1996), Hyperion
The Art of Hercules: The Chaos of Creation (1997), Hyperion
Dolls! Dolls! Dolls!: Deep Inside Valley of the Dolls, the Most Beloved Bad Book and Movie of All Time (2020) Penguin Books

See also
 Psycho (1960 Hitchcock film)

References

External links
 

Living people
American non-fiction writers
American people of Portuguese descent
American male journalists
University of Massachusetts Dartmouth alumni
People from Fall River, Massachusetts
People from Somerset, Massachusetts
Year of birth missing (living people)